Lists of Christmas television episodes include:

List of Christmas television episodes and specials in the United Kingdom
List of Christmas television specials
List of United States Christmas television episodes
List of United States Christmas television specials

Television